Nenad Veselji (born 3 February 1971) is a retired footballer who played as a striker. Born in the SFR Yugoslavia, he represented Malta internationally.

Playing career
Nenad started his career while still in Yugoslavia playing for OFK Beograd. In 1994, he came to Malta and started playing for Floriana FC where he played for three seasons. In 1997, he moved to Valletta FC. He spent his best years of his career playing for Valletta, where he stayed until January 2001, when he moved for a short spell with Birkirkara FC. In 2001, he moved to Sliema Wanderers where he played until January 2004, before rejoining Valletta FC and after half a season, he ended his playing career. Having represented the best Maltese clubs in the period, Nenad played an impressive 177 matches in the Maltese Premier League, having scored 60 goals in ten seasons he played.

International career
Nenad has also represented the Malta national football team a total of seven times between the years 1999 and 2000.

Honours
Floriana FC
2 times winner of Super 5 Cup: 1994–95 and 1995–96
Valletta FC
3 times Champion of Maltese Premier League: 1997–98, 1998–99 and 2000–01
2 times winner of Maltese Cup: 1998–99 and 2000–01
3 times winner of Maltese Super Cup: 1997–97, 1998–99 and 2000–01
1-time winner of Löwenbräu Cup: 1997–98
1-time winner of Super 5 Cup: 1999-00
1-time winner of Centenary Cup: 2000
Sliema Wanderers
2 times Champion of Maltese Premier League: 2002–03 and 2003–04
1-time winner of Löwenbräu Cup: 2002
1-time winner of Super 5 Cup: 2001–02

References

External sources
 
 Career story and photos at Valletta FC official site.

1971 births
Living people
Serbian emigrants to Malta
People with acquired Maltese citizenship
Maltese footballers
Malta international footballers
Yugoslav footballers
OFK Beograd players
Yugoslav First League players
Floriana F.C. players
Valletta F.C. players
Birkirkara F.C. players
Sliema Wanderers F.C. players
Association football forwards